The Lucknow–Kanpur Expressway or National Expressway 6 (NE-6), is an under construction 62 km long, 6-lane wide(expandable to 8) access controlled expressway in India's Uttar Pradesh. The expressway will start from its junction with NH-27 near Shaheed Path in South Lucknow (km 11.000 of existing NH-27) connecting Bani, Kantha, Amarsas and terminating at its junction with NH No. 27 (km 71.300 of existing NH-27) near Kanpur.

The expressway’s foundation stone was laid in March 2019 (again on January 5, 2022), and was notified as National Expressway 6 in the Gazette of India in December 2020.

This mix of brownfield-upgrade and greenfield project’s Detailed Project Report (DPR) was prepared by Egis India Consulting Engineers Pvt. Ltd. Lucknow – Kanpur Expressway will have 2 elevated portions between Amausi and Bani – from chainage 13.025 to 16.400 (3.375 km) and 18.480 to 27.620 (9.14 km). It will consist of 3 major bridges, 28 minor bridges, 38 underpasses and 6 flyovers.

Status updates
 Nov 2018: Detailed Project Report for ₹4,500 crore project finalised and submitted to the Government of Uttar Pradesh .
 Mar 2019: Foundation stone laid down on 7 March by Union Ministers - Rajnath Singh and Nitin Gadkari for this project.
 May 2019: 90% land to be acquired by June 2019 followed by tendering. Civil work is expected to start by August 2019.
  Feb 2020: Notification for land acquisition to be issued soon.
 Aug 2020: Construction to start by March 2021, and expressway to be ready by March 2023.
 Sep 2020: Land acquisition under progress. Civil construction work to start in April 2021 and expressway to be ready by October 2023.
 Dec 2020: Lucknow Kanpur Expressway, declared as NE 6 on December 15, 2020.
 Feb 2021: Land acquisition done. Civil engineering work is expected to start in July 2021, and thereafter, it is expected to take 30 more months for project completion.
June 2021: 400 hectares out of total requirement of 465 hectare land is acquired i.e. 86% land acquired. NHAI to bid out expressway in July and the civil work is expected to start by the end of the year. 
Jan 2022: Union Road Transport and Highways Minister Shri Nitin Gadkari, Union Defence Minister Shri Rajnath Singh and CM Yogi Adityanath laid the foundation stone of Kanpur Lucknow expressway at Lucknow as on 5 Jan 2022.
Feb 2022:  PNC Infratech emerges as the Lowest Bidder and is selected by NHAI to build and operate both packages of the 6-lane (expandable to 8) Expressway under the Hybrid Annuity Model (HAM) beating Apco Infratech, MEIL, Gawar Construction and GR Infraprojects.

See also
 Bundelkhand Expressway
 Purvanchal Expressway
 Yamuna Expressway
 Ganga Expressway

References

National expressways in India
Proposed expressways in India
Expressways in Uttar Pradesh
Transport in Kanpur
Proposed infrastructure in Uttar Pradesh
Transport in Lucknow